Bayan is a village in the Dashkasan District of Azerbaijan. The village had an Armenian population before the exodus of Armenians from Azerbaijan after the outbreak of the Nagorno-Karabakh conflict.

Demographics 
The village currently has a population of 2,047 and is the most populous municipality in the Dashkasan District, except for the capital Daşkəsən.

Gallery

References

External links 

Populated places in Dashkasan District